The Vanapa is a river of Papua New Guinea. It flows into Galley Reach of Redscar Bay to the north-west of Port Moresby.

References

External links
Vanapa River at Geographic Names
Map of rivers in the area

Rivers of Papua New Guinea
Central Province (Papua New Guinea)